Yang Chunyuan (born 20 August 1973) is a Chinese speed skater. She competed at the 1994, 1998 and the 2002 Winter Olympics.

References

1973 births
Living people
Chinese female speed skaters
Olympic speed skaters of China
Speed skaters at the 1994 Winter Olympics
Speed skaters at the 1998 Winter Olympics
Speed skaters at the 2002 Winter Olympics
People from Suihua
Speed skaters at the 1999 Asian Winter Games
Medalists at the 1999 Asian Winter Games
Asian Games medalists in speed skating
Asian Games silver medalists for China
Universiade gold medalists for China
Universiade medalists in speed skating
Competitors at the 1997 Winter Universiade
20th-century Chinese women
21st-century Chinese women